At the founding of The Protestant Episcopal Church in the United States, all of New England was considered one diocese — the Diocese of Connecticut — led by Bishop Samuel Seabury. In 1811, the congregations in Massachusetts petitioned the General Convention to form a separate diocese consisting of the states of Massachusetts (including Maine), Rhode Island, New Hampshire, and Vermont.  Titled the Eastern Diocese of the Episcopal Church in the United States of America, its first bishop was Alexander Viets Griswold.

Vermont elected its own bishop in 1832, and separated from the Eastern Diocese. New Hampshire also separated in 1832. The Eastern Diocese ceased to exist in 1843, when Rhode Island and Maine also elected bishops, following the death of Bishop Griswold.

See also

Episcopal Diocese of Massachusetts
List of Episcopal bishops
Ecclesiastical provinces and dioceses of the Episcopal Church#Dioceses no longer in existence

References
 Albright, Raymond W. (1964). A History of the Protestant Episcopal Church, New York:Macmillan. pp. 165ff
 Julia Chester Emery, Alexander Viets Griswold and the Eastern Diocese (1921)

Eastern
 
Former Anglican dioceses
Religion in New England
Organizations disestablished in 1843